Xiasi Dog (Chinese: 下司犬) or Lower Division Dog is a breed of dog named after the village of Xiasi, Guizhou Province in China where they have been raised by the Miao people for thousands of years.  Historically bred as a hunting dog and watchdog, the Xiasi Dog is prized today for bringing wealth to the family.  Today the breed is critically endangered with low genetic diversity and an estimate of only 270 purebred Xiasi left. Xiasi Dogs are now accepted in most Chinese dog shows.

Characteristics 
Xiasi are white or cream in color with wiry hair and a pale pink nose.  Their hair comes in three lengths: short, medium and long. Their head should be sizeable, the chest deep and round, and the tail should stick up.

See also
 Dogs portal
 List of dog breeds

References

Dog breeds originating in China